Stemphylium bolickii is a plant pathogen infecting kalanchoes.

References 

Fungal plant pathogens and diseases
Ornamental plant pathogens and diseases
Pleosporaceae